Ysgol Gymraeg Ystalyfera Bro Dur is a Welsh-medium comprehensive school in Neath Port Talbot, Wales. The school provides education to three to eighteen-year-old pupils in Neath Port Talbot and south Powys from three campuses in Ystalyfera and Port Talbot.

History
It was founded in 1969 as Ysgol Gyfun Ystalyfera (Ystalyfera Secondary School), on the site of the former Ystalyfera Grammar School.
In 2017 the school merged with Ysgol Gynradd y Wern primary school to form an all-age school for ages three to eighteen. In September 2018 the Bro Dur ('Steel Land') campus opened in Port Talbot, which operates alongside the primary and secondary school campuses in Ystalyfera. A second Welsh-medium comprehensive campus named Ysgol Gyfun Gymraeg Bro Dur was opened, it is also referred to as Ystalyfera South.

Notable alumni

Notable former pupils of Ystalyfera Grammar School and Ysgol Ystalyfera include:
 Gwenallt (D. Gwenallt Jones, 1899–1968), poet
 Richard Aaron (1901–1987), philosopher
 Geoffrey Moses (born 1952), cricketer and classical singer
  (born 1958), journalist and radio presenter
 Siân Lloyd (born 1958), television presenter
 Ian Jones, television executive, chief executive of S4C
  (born 1961), actor and singer
 Steffan Rhodri (born 1967), actor
 Alun Cairns (born 1970), politician, former Secretary of State for Wales
 Derwyn Jones (born 1970), rugby union player for Cardiff and Wales
 Euros Lyn (born 1971), television director
 Rhodri Owen (born 1972), radio and television presenter
 Jeremy Miles, politician, Minister for Education and the Welsh Language
 Kristian Phillips (born 1990), rugby union player for Bath, represented Wales at U18 and U20 levels.
 Ben Davies (born 1993), footballer for Tottenham Hotspur and Wales

References

External links
 
 

Secondary schools in Neath Port Talbot